Madison Keys defeated Alison Riske in the final, 6–1, 6–2 to win the women's singles tennis title at the 2022 Adelaide International 2.

Seeds

Draw

Finals

Top half

Bottom half

Qualifying

Seeds

Qualifiers

Lucky losers
  Danka Kovinić

Qualifying draw

First qualifier

Second qualifier

Third qualifier

Fourth qualifier

Fifth qualifier

Sixth qualifier

References

External links
 Main draw
 Qualifying draw

Adelaide International 2
Adelaide International (tennis)
Adelaide